Clive Edward Baker (born 14 March 1959) is an English former professional footballer who played as a goalkeeper for Norwich City, Barnsley and Coventry City in the Football League and for Ipswich Town in the Premier League.

Baker was born in West Runton, Norfolk. He began his career at Norwich City in July 1977 appearing 14 times in his 7 years at the club. From Norwich he moved to Barnsley where he again played for seven years, this time racking up 291 appearances and twice winning the club's Player of the Year award. He was transferred to Coventry City in August 1991, and a year later, without having appeared for Coventry's Football League team, he moved to his final club, Ipswich Town. He retired from professional football in the 1994–95 season as one of only a few to play for both Ipswich Town and Norwich City. After his retirement from football he moved into a job in the insurance industry in London.

References

External links
 
 Career information at ex-canaries.co.uk

1959 births
Living people
People from West Runton
English footballers
Association football goalkeepers
Norwich City F.C. players
Barnsley F.C. players
Coventry City F.C. players
Ipswich Town F.C. players
English Football League players
Premier League players